Taylor Aylmer (born September 23, 1998) is an American professional soccer player who plays as a midfielder for Washington Spirit of the National Women's Soccer League (NWSL).

Early life
Raised in Garnerville, New York located north of New York City, Aylmer attended North Rockland High School where she played on the varsity team for four years and captained the team in 2015. The same year, she earned all-league, all-section, all-state, honors and was named Player of the Year. Aylmer led the team to the state finals her junior and senior year.

Aylmer played for World Class FC in the Elite Clubs National League (ECNL). Excelling academically, she was named a  2015-16 NSCAA High School Scholar All-American and was a member of the National Honor Society and Math, Science, English, and Social Studies Honor Society.

College career 
Aylmer attended Rutgers University where she played for the Rutgers Scarlet Knights women's soccer team from 2016–19. She captained the team in 2019 and co-captained in 2018. During her freshman year in 2016, she scored two goals and provided three assists in the 23 matches she played. She was named to the Big Ten Conference All-Freshman Team. In 2017, she was a starting midfielder in 19 of the team's 21 matches. She scored a penalty kick — the game winner — in a 4–0 win against Monmouth University. The same year, she as named 2017 Academic All-Big Ten for the first of three consecutive years. As a junior, Aylmer was named co-captain and starting midfielder in all 20 matches. As captain during her senior year, her nine assists ranked top on the team. She was named to the 2019 All-Region Second Team, All-Big Ten Third Team, Scholar All-Region Second Team and earned Big Ten Sportsmanship Award honors.

Club career

NJ/NY Gotham FC, 2021
NJ/NY Gotham FC signed Aylmer as a National Team Replacement Player in 2021. She made her professional debut on April 14, 2021 during a 1–0 win against Orlando Pride in the 2021 NWSL Challenge Cup.

References

External links 
 
 
 
 Rutgers player profile

Living people
1998 births
American women's soccer players
Rutgers Scarlet Knights women's soccer players
NJ/NY Gotham FC players
National Women's Soccer League players
People from Rockland County, New York
Soccer players from New York (state)
Women's association football midfielders
Washington Spirit players